A constitutional referendum was held in Switzerland on 25 October 1885. The constitutional amendments were approved by 59.4% of voters and a majority of cantons.

Background
In order to pass, any amendments to the constitution needed a double majority; a majority of the popular vote and majority of the cantons. The decision of each canton was based on the vote in that canton. Full cantons counted as one vote, whilst half cantons counted as half.

Results

References

1885 referendums
1885 in Switzerland
1885
Constitutional referendums in Switzerland